Rettenbach may refer to the following places:

in Bavaria, Germany:
Rettenbach, Upper Palatinate, in the district of Cham
Rettenbach, Swabia, in the district of Günzburg
Rettenbach am Auerberg, in the district Ostallgäu
Markt Rettenbach, in the district Unterallgäu
in Austria:
Rettenbach glacier, near Sölden in the ôtztal Alps
Rettenbach (ski slope), World Cup alpine ski slope near Sölden in the ôtztal Alps